The Middlesex County Park System is an agency that maintains over 32 parks and recreational areas, in Middlesex County, New Jersey, United States. The largest park is Thompson Park in Monroe Township and Jamesburg with 675 acres.

List of parks

Nature preserves

References

External links

 
County government agencies in New Jersey
County parks departments in the United States